The China Online Centre is a skyscraper located in the Wan Chai area of Hong Kong. The building was completed in 2000. It was designed by architectural firm Rocco Design Limited, and was developed by Jaffe Development. The China Online Centre, which stands as the 52nd-tallest building in Hong Kong, is composed entirely of commercial office space.

See also
List of tallest buildings in Hong Kong

References

Skyscraper office buildings in Hong Kong
Office buildings completed in 2000
Wan Chai